Kasi or Kassi is a Pashtun tribe from the Sarbani tribal confederacy, primarily found in Quetta, Pakistan and Nangarhar, Afghanistan. Kasi are the royal family of Balochistan. Other sub-tribes such as Sherani, Kehthran and Hassani in Zhob and Barkan also belong to the Kasi family and Kasi tribe and names of Kand and Zamand are also found in Loy Kandahar.

Kasi Alozai branch
Caste Kasi branch Alozai:

Alozai Tribe is situated in Kili Kateer Alozai Kuchlak

The grandfather of Alozai Kasi tribe is known as Alhaaj Abdus Salam Alozai Kasi

Alhaaj Abdus Salam Kasi son/of Shahab Uddin Kasi Alozai has 5 sons:

1. Yahya Khan Kasi Alozai.

2. Zakaria Khan Kasi Alozai.

3. Ex. A.C. Quetta, Asad Khan Kasi Alozai

4. Essa Khan Kasi Alozai

5. Meher Ullah Khan Kasi Alozai

6. Malik Bismillah Khan Kasi Chinarzai in Beleli, Quetta

References

Sources
 Pata Khazana (in Persian language) - Archived

External links
 www.khyber.org

Sarbani Pashtun tribes
Ethnic groups in Afghanistan
Ethnic groups in Pakistan